The 2012–13 Ole Miss Rebels men's basketball team represented the University of Mississippi in the 2012–13 college basketball season. The team's head coach was Andy Kennedy, in his seventh season at Ole Miss. The team played their home games at the Tad Smith Coliseum in Oxford, Mississippi as a member of the Southeastern Conference.

After finishing the regular season with a record of 23–8 (12–6 SEC), the Rebels claimed the 2013 SEC tournament championship by defeating Florida in the title game. They earned an automatic berth into the 2013 NCAA tournament as a #12 seed in the west region, where they advanced to the third round before falling to La Salle.

Preseason
The Rebels posted a record of 20–14 (8-8 SEC) in the 2011–12 season and finished seventh in the SEC standings.  The Rebels were invited to the 2012 NIT and lost in the first round to Illinois State.  
 
Entering his seventh year as the Rebels’ head coach, Kennedy's 108 wins are the most by any coach in program history in a five-year span, and the Rebels’ 38 victories over Southeastern Conference foes are the most by a Rebel coach in his first five seasons. The 2012–13 Rebel squad will look to build on three straight seasons with 20 or more wins and a postseason berth.

Roster

Depth chart

Schedule

|-
!colspan=12| Exhibition

|-
!colspan=12| Non-conference regular season

|-
!colspan=12| SEC Regular Season

|-
!colspan=12| SEC tournament

|-
!colspan=12|NCAA tournament

|-

|-
| colspan="12" | *Non-Conference Game. Rankings from AP poll. All times are in Central Time.
|}

References

Ole Miss
Ole Miss Rebels men's basketball seasons
Ole Miss
Ole Miss Rebels
Ole Miss Rebels